Michael Dixon (born 21 September 1954) is a cricket umpire from Liverpool, Lancashire, England. Dixon first stood in a senior match in a List A match between Ireland and the Essex Cricket Board in the 1999 NatWest Trophy. In total, Dixon stood in seven List A matches between 1999 and 2003.  He first stood in a first-class match when Cambridge UCCE played Sussex County Cricket Club in 2001. Between 2001 and 2003, he stood in nine first-class matches. He has also stood as an umpire in Minor counties cricket, as well as umpiring in the Liverpool and District Premier League.

References

External links
Michael Dixon at ESPNcricinfo
Michael Dixon at CricketArchive

1954 births
Living people
Sportspeople from Liverpool
English cricket umpires